Yana Alexandrovna Buchina (born 7 February 1992) is a former Russian tennis player. She won two singles titles and one doubles title on tournaments of the ITF Women's Circuit. Her career-high singles ranking is world No. 334, achieved on 12 August 2013.

Personal life
Yana Buchina was born to Alexander and Lillia Buchina in Samara, Russia, where she resides. Her favourite surfaces are grass and hardcourts. She was coached by V. Potapenko and by Eugenia Maniokova.

Tennis career

Junior career
In 2009, she played in the third round of the Australian Open girls' singles event, and the first round of the girls' doubles event, partnering Heather Watson. The duo lost to Viktoria Kamenskaya and Karina Pimkina 7–5, 6–4. She reached the second round of the French Open girls' event and the semi-finals of the doubles.
Yana lost in the third round of girls' singles event and in the third round of the doubles at Wimbledon. And at US Open, she lost in the final of the singles event to Briton Heather Watson, 4–6, 1–6.

In 2010, she lost in the third round of the girls' singles event of the Australian Open.

ITF Circuit finals

Singles (2–2)

Doubles (1–2)

References

External links
 
 
 

1992 births
Living people
Russian female tennis players
Tennis players from Moscow
20th-century Russian women
21st-century Russian women